Carter Coughlin (born July 21, 1997) is an American football linebacker for the New York Giants of the National Football League (NFL). He played college football at Minnesota, and was drafted by the Giants in the seventh round of the 2020 NFL Draft

Early life and high school
Coughlin grew up in Eden Prairie, Minnesota and attended Eden Prairie High School, where he played basketball and football. He helped lead the Eagles to back-to-back state championships as a sophomore and junior. As a senior, he recorded 35 tackles, 7.0 tackles for loss, two pass breakups and one fumble recovery. He was named first-team All-State and played in the All-American Bowl. A 4-star recruit, Coughlin committed to Minnesota over offers from Iowa, Michigan State, Ohio State, Pittsburgh, Oregon, and Wisconsin.

College career
Coughlin played in 11 games as a true freshman and finished the season with 25 tackles including four tackles for loss and two sacks. He became a starter at outside linebacker going into his sophomore season and was named honorable mention All-Big Ten Conference after leading the Golden Gophers with 11.5 for a loss and 6.5 sacks. As a junior, Coughlin recorded 48 tackles and led the team with 9.5 sacks, 15 tackles for loss and four forced fumbles and was named second-team All-Big Ten. Coughlin was named second-team All-Big Ten again as a senior after making 49 tackles with 9.5 for loss and 4.5 sacks.

Professional career 

Coughlin was selected by the New York Giants in the seventh round with the 218th overall pick in the 2020 NFL Draft. In Week 8 against the Tampa Bay Buccaneers on Monday Night Football, Coughlin recorded his first career sack on Tom Brady during the Bucs’ 25–23 win.

On November 1, 2021 Coughlin was placed on injured reserve.

References

External links
Minnesota Golden Gophers bio
New York Giants bio

1997 births
Living people
People from Eden Prairie, Minnesota
Players of American football from Minnesota
Sportspeople from the Minneapolis–Saint Paul metropolitan area
American football linebackers
Minnesota Golden Gophers football players
New York Giants players